The North Australian may refer to:

 The North Australian (Queensland), a newspaper published in Queensland in the 1860s 
 The North Australian (Northern Territory), a newspaper published in the Northern Territory in the 1880s